Laboratory is a facility where scientific experiments are performed.

Laboratory may also refer to:

Places
Laboratory, North Carolina, an unincorporated community, United States
Laboratory, Pennsylvania, an unincorporated community, United States